André Demetz (1902-1977) was a French general, who fought in World War II and later rose to high rank after the war. Demetz was the first commander of the 25th Airborne Division during a period in which the French Army was redefining itself following the defeats and internal conflicts of World War II. He later commanded a military region, was Military Governor of Paris, and also served as the Chief of Staff for Administration and Logistics at NATO Headquarters.

References

1902 births
1977 deaths
Military personnel from Dijon
French military personnel of World War II
French generals
French military leaders
École Spéciale Militaire de Saint-Cyr alumni
Military governors of Paris